The East Anglian League was a football league in the East Anglia region of England.

History
The league was established in 1903 as the South East Anglian League. The founder member clubs were Chelmsford City, Colchester Crown, Colchester Town, Harwich & Parkeston and Ipswich Town, with Ipswich winning the inaugural league title. In 1908 it was renamed the East Anglian League. By the 1960s the league was dominated by clubs from Norfolk and in 1964 it merged with the Norfolk & Suffolk League (also largely consisting of Norfolk-based clubs) to form the Anglian Combination.

Champions

Member clubs

Ashill
Ashlea Lowestoft
Attleborough Town
Beccles
Beccles Caxton
Blofield & District
Bury St Edmunds
Bungay Town Reserves
Cambridge Town
Cambridge United
Carrow
Chelmsford
Chemicals
Colchester Crown
Colchester Town
Coltishall
Corton
Costessey Sports
East Harling
Eastern Coachworks
Eastern Coachworks Reserves
Eaton Rangers
Gorleston
Gorleston Reserves
Great Yarmouth Town
Great Yarmouth Town Reserves
Harleston Town
Harwich & Parkeston
Henderson United
Holt United
Horsford United
Ipswich Town
Kings Own Scot Borders
Kirkley
Kirkley Reserves
Leicester Regiment
Leiston
Leiston St Margarets
Loddon United
Lowestoft BSRA
Lowestoft Corinthinans
Lowestoft Town
Lowestoft Town Reserves
Lowestoft Railway Social
Lynn Town
Mann-Egerton
Mundeseley United
Norfolk Regiment
Norman Old Boys
North Walsham Town
Northampton Regiment
Norwich CEYMS Reserves
Norwich City Reserves
Norwich City 'B'
Norwich Defiants
Norwich Liberals
Norwich Speedways
St Andrew's
Norwich Union
Orwell Works
Oulton Broad
RAF Horsham St Faith
RAF Swinton Manor
RAF Watton
Shipdham
Southwold Town
Stalham Town
Swaffham Town
Thorpe
Watton United
West Yorkshire Regiment
Wrentham
Wroxham
Wymondham Old Boys
Wymondham Town
York Athletic

References

 
 
Defunct football leagues in England
1903 establishments in England
1964 disestablishments in England